The women's long jump event at the 2013 Summer Universiade was held on 7–8 July 2013.

Medalists

Results

Qualification
Qualification: 6.25 m (Q) or at least 12 best (q) qualified for the final.

Final

References

Long
2013 in women's athletics
2013